Prattville is a census-designated place (CDP) in Plumas County, California, United States. The population was 33 at the 2010 census, up from 28 at the 2000 census.

Geography
Prattville is located at  (40.208022, -121.156603).

Demographics

2010
At the 2010 census Prattville had a population of 33. The racial makeup of Prattville was 33 (100.0%) White, 0 (0.0%) African American, 0 (0.0%) Native American, 0 (0.0%) Asian, 0 (0.0%) Pacific Islander, 0 (0.0%) from other races, and 0 (0.0%) from two or more races. Hispanic or Latino of any race were 0 people (0.0%).

The whole population lived in households, no one lived in non-institutionalized group quarters and no one was institutionalized.

There were 14 households, 5 (35.7%) had children under the age of 18 living in them, 7 (50.0%) were opposite-sex married couples living together, 1 (7.1%) had a female householder with no husband present, 1 (7.1%) had a male householder with no wife present.  There were 1 (7.1%) unmarried opposite-sex partnerships, and 0 (0%) same-sex married couples or partnerships. 5 households (35.7%) were one person and 3 (21.4%) had someone living alone who was 65 or older. The average household size was 2.36.  There were 9 families (64.3% of households); the average family size was 3.00.

The age distribution was 8 people (24.2%) under the age of 18, 0 people (0%) aged 18 to 24, 8 people (24.2%) aged 25 to 44, 5 people (15.2%) aged 45 to 64, and 12 people (36.4%) who were 65 or older.  The median age was 58.5 years. For every 100 females, there were 135.7 males.  For every 100 females age 18 and over, there were 127.3 males.

There were 102 housing units at an average density of 169.2 per square mile, of the occupied units 12 (85.7%) were owner-occupied and 2 (14.3%) were rented. The homeowner vacancy rate was 0%; the rental vacancy rate was 0%.  29 people (87.9% of the population) lived in owner-occupied housing units and 4 people (12.1%) lived in rental housing units.

2000
At the 2000 census there were 28 people, 17 households, and 7 families in the CDP. The racial makeup of the CDP was 100.00% White.
Of the 17 households 5.9% had children under the age of 18 living with them, 41.2% were married couples living together, and 58.8% were non-families. 52.9% of households were one person and 35.3% were one person aged 65 or older. The average household size was 1.65 and the average family size was 2.43.

The age distribution was 10.7% under the age of 18, 10.7% from 25 to 44, 42.9% from 45 to 64, and 35.7% 65 or older. The median age was 60 years. For every 100 females, there were 115.4 males. For every 100 females age 18 and over, there were 92.3 males.

The median household income was $70,313 and the median family income  was $71,250. Males had a median income of $71,250 versus $36,250 for females. The per capita income for the CDP was $37,786. None of the population and none of the families were below the poverty line.

Politics

References

Census-designated places in Plumas County, California
Census-designated places in California